is a Japanese manga series written by Hirohisa Soda, illustrated by Noboru Akashi and Haruka Inui and was published by Akita Shoten in Weekly Shonen Champion. It was adapted into an anime television series produced by Tatsunoko Productions and ran from January 9 to December 24, 1983, on Fuji TV. It was later released in Germany and Sweden as Rock 'n Cop, in Finland as Rocki-kyttä(Rocki-Cop), in France as Super Durand (roughly, "Super Jones" or "Super Smith"), and in Italy as Ryo, un ragazzo contro un impero ("Ryo, a boy against an empire").

Saban Entertainment dubbed it under the title Rock 'n Cop, but this dub was never released in the United States. The Saban version was however used as the base for the German, Swedish and Finnish versions. A film version was in the works, but also abandoned. The anime is licensed in North America by Sentai Filmworks.

Plot
The story tells of a young man and his cat who are being pursued by the police during a particularly stormy night in a city in 1983. The young man drives his car right into the middle of a cyclone and is caught in a space/time anomaly. As a result, they end up in the year 2050.

Suffering from complete memory loss, he soon finds that he is being pursued by the army-like forces of Necrime, a top criminal organization led by Ludovich. Taking the name Ryū Urashima, the young man joins the police force and fights back against Necrime. He is joined in the fight by Sophia, a happy-go-lucky ex-nun, and Claude, a fellow officer. The unit is run by Inspector Gondo Toru. He is also joined by his cat, Myaa, whom made the time journey with him and is one of the few links to his past that he remembers.

Characters
Police Division 38 (Magna Police Force)
 /Urashiman: 
 : 
 : 
 : 
 Inspector :

Necrime
 : 
 : 
 /Yetander: 
 : 
 : 
 : 
 : 
 : 
 : , Kazuyuki Sogabe (young)
 :

References

External links
 Mirai Keisatsu Urashiman at Tokyo MX 
 

1983 anime television series debuts
Fictional Japanese police officers
Fuji TV original programming
Sentai Filmworks
Tatsunoko Production
Akita Shoten manga
Comics set in the 21st century
Shōnen manga
Science fiction anime and manga